Alex Lozowski (born 30 June 1993) is an English professional rugby union footballer playing in the Gallagher Premiership for Saracens. He was named in Eddie Jones's 2017 Six Nations  England  squad and made his England debut in June 2017 against Argentina.

Early life
Lozowski is the son of Rob Lozowski and was a sporting allrounder in his teenage years, playing not only rugby for the Wasps academy but also football for the Chelsea academy. After leaving Watford Boys Grammar School he went to Leeds University to study a degree in Economics.

Club career

Yorkshire Carnegie
While at university, Lozowski was selected on the bench for Yorkshire Carnegie, then known as Leeds Carnegie, for their game against Pontypridd in the British and Irish Cup during the 2012/13 season. After impressing in this game he was selected as a member of their first team squad for the 2013/14 season in the RFU Championship. During this season he played not only Fly Half but also occasionally at Full back and made 25 appearances scoring 8 tries and 195 points in total. In recognition of his performances over the season, Lozowski was awarded Leed's Young Player of the Season award. It was announced during the season, that he would leave at the end of the season to join Wasps in the Aviva Premiership.

Wasps
Lozowski joined Wasps at the start of the 2014/15 season. He played very regularly for the team during the season, often coming off the bench for Andy Goode. During the season, he started against reigning Heineken Cup champions Toulon in the quarter final of the European Rugby Champions Cup. He was also nominated for the LV Breakthrough Player of the Season for his performances in the LV Cup. Over the season, Lozowski played 21 matches scoring 2 tries and 102 points in total.

Saracens
On 13 January 2016, Lozowski made the switch to join Premiership rivals Saracens on a long-term deal ahead of the 2016-17 season. During his time at Saracens he has won two Premiership titles in 2018 and 2019. He also helped Saracens win the European Champions Cup in 2017 and 2019. He re-signed with Saracens for two years ahead of the 2020–21 season but will spend a season on loan at Montpellier.

International career

England
Lozowski was called up to the senior England squad by Eddie Jones in October 2016. On 20 April 2017, Lozowski was named in the England tour party to Argentina in June for a 2-test series and made his international debut in the first test in San Juan on 10 June.

International tries

Honours
Saracens
 Aviva Premiership: 2018, 2019
 European Rugby Champions Cup: 2017,2019
 European Rugby Challenge Cup: 2021

References

External links
Saracens Profile
RFU Profile
ESPN Profile

1993 births
Living people
Alumni of the University of Leeds
England international rugby union players
English rugby union players
Leeds Tykes players
People educated at Watford Grammar School for Boys
Rugby union fly-halves
Rugby union players from London Borough of Brent
Saracens F.C. players
Wasps RFC players